Trapunto, from the Italian for "to quilt", is a method of quilting that is also called "stuffed technique". A puffy, decorative feature, trapunto utilizes at least two layers, the underside of which is slit and padded, producing a raised surface on the quilt.

History
The style originated in Italy before the 14th century.

Technique
Trapunto is often confused with the relatively similar techniques used in making traditional whole cloth Provençal quilts that were developed from the 17th century onwards in France.

Earliest
One of the earliest surviving examples of trapunto quilting is the Tristan Quilt in the Victoria and Albert Museum, a linen quilt representing scenes from the story of Tristan and Isolde which was made in Sicily during the second half of the 13th century. Another piece of the Tristan Quilt, thought to be from a pair to the V. & A.'s example, is in the Bargello, an art museum in Florence.

Modern
The technique was used for the inner-tunic collars worn in Starfleet uniforms from Star Trek II: The Wrath of Khan. As of the 1980s, functional trapunto machines were rare, and the specialized needles which they employed were even rarer.

References

Quilting